The European Prize for Political Culture is endowed with 50,000 euros and is awarded by the Swiss Hans Ringier Foundation in Ascona. Foundation President is Frank A. Meyer. The award ceremony has been part of the traditional "Dîner Républicain" by Frank A. Meyer in the Hotel Castello del Sole in Ascona. The "Dîner Républicain" has been taking place for over 40 years on the occasion of the Locarno International Film Festival.

Recipients

 2006 Jean-Claude Juncker
 2007 Boris Tadić
 2008 Jürgen Habermas
 2009 Pascal Lamy
 2010 Jean-Claude Trichet
 2011 Hans-Dietrich Genscher
 2012 Donald Tusk
 2013 Wolfgang Schäuble
 2014 Heinrich August Winkler
 2015 Mario Draghi
 2016 Frank-Walter Steinmeier
 2017 Margrethe Vestager
 2018 Sir Christopher Clark
 2019 Zuzana Čaputová
 2021 Peter Sloterdijk
 2022 Kaja Kallas

References

Politics awards
Awards established in 2006